Ricardo Henrique Schuck Friedrich (born 18 February 1993) is a Brazilian professional footballer who currently plays as a goalkeeper for Kalmar FF.

Career
In April 2016, RoPS announced the signing of Ricardo Friedrich. During a game between RoPS and FF Jaro on 28 June 2015, Ricardo was substituted at half-time after suffering a concussion during the first half. In December 2015, Ricardo extended his contract with RoPS for an additional two-seasons.

Personal life
He is the younger brother of Douglas, also a goalkeeper.

Career statistics

References

External links

1993 births
Living people
Brazilian footballers
Brazilian people of German descent
Association football goalkeepers
Veikkausliiga players
Kakkonen players
Eliteserien players
Norwegian First Division players
Süper Lig players
Ituano FC players
Rovaniemen Palloseura players
FC Santa Claus players
FK Bodø/Glimt players
Kalmar FF players
MKE Ankaragücü footballers
Brazilian expatriate footballers
Expatriate footballers in Finland
Expatriate footballers in Norway
Expatriate footballers in Turkey
Expatriate footballers in Sweden
Brazilian expatriate sportspeople in Finland
Brazilian expatriate sportspeople in Norway
Brazilian expatriate sportspeople in Turkey
Brazilian expatriate sportspeople in Sweden